Cyno mordicans is a species of leaf beetle endemic to South Africa, and the only member of the genus Cyno. It was first described by the English entomologist Thomas Ansell Marshall in 1865.

References

Eumolpinae
Endemic beetles of South Africa
Taxa named by Thomas Ansell Marshall
Beetles described in 1865